Boyd Kestner (born November 23, 1964) is an American actor. Kestner starred in The Outsiders television series, and later became well known for his role as Alex Barth in the television drama Knots Landing. He also appeared in the 1997 Demi Moore film G. I. Jane and The Art of Murder, a 1999 Lifetime movie. As of October 2017, Kestner released his own brand of alcoholic cider promptly named, Dixon Cider.

Filmography

Film

Television

External links
 

1964 births
American male television actors
Living people
Male actors from Virginia